Olivier Nägele (born 17 March 1972) is a Liechtensteiner ski mountaineer.

Nägele started ski mountaineering in 1990 and competed first Mountain Attack race in 2000. Because Liechtenstein has no national ski mountaineering team, he mostly takes part in international events as a single participant.

Selected results 
 2002:
 8th, Trofeo Mezzalama (together with Alexander Hug and Nicolao Leone Lanfranchi)
 2002:
 8th, World Championship single race
 2003:
 3rd, Mountain Attack marathon
 2004:
 3rd, Mountain Attack marathon
 5th, World Championship vertical race
 8th, World Championship single race
 2005:
 3rd, Mountain Attack marathon
 4th, Trofeo Mezzalama (together with Alexander Lugger and Hansjörg Lunger)
 2006:
 6th (and 1st "seniors II" ranking), Patrouille des Glaciers, together with Alexander Lugger and Tony Sbalbi
 9th, World Championship vertical race
 1st, Trophée des Gastlosen, together with Marcel Marti
 2007:
 1st, Dolomiti Cup team (together with Mirco Mezzanotte)
 8th, European Championship vertical race

Pierra Menta 

 2001: 10th, together with Alexander Hug
 2002: 7th, together with Jean Pellissier

References

External links 
 Olivier Nägele at skimountaineering.org

1972 births
Liechtenstein male ski mountaineers
Living people